Ruhr in Love or Ruhr-in-Love is an annual family festival of the electronic music scene in Oberhausen, Germany, where it has been held since June 2003. It is a one-day open-air festival at which more than 35 "colourful and imaginatively designed floors" are presented by clubs, event organisers, record labels, booking agencies, radio stations, magazines etc. The focal point is the Mixery-Stage featuring international headliners.

The festival is put on by I-Motion GmbH, now a part of SFX Entertainment. Every kind of electronic music is represented. There is an official indoor after-party called Mega-Love Invasion. The 2014 event drew 46,000 people despite rain; there were a record 400 DJs.

Since 2003 Ruhr-in-Love is supported by eve&rave Münster e.V. with drug-information-desks.

Years

See also

 List of electronic music festivals

References

External links
 Official site

Music festivals established in 2003
Electronic music festivals in Germany
Techno
2003 establishments in Germany